The Englishman at the Moulin Rouge is a late-19th-century painting by French artist Henri de Toulouse-Lautrec. Done in oil on cardboard, the work depicts British artist William T. Warrener – a close friend of Lautrec – and two women at the Moulin Rouge cabaret in Paris. The painting served as a preparatory study for a color lithograph of 1892, and is in the collection of the Metropolitan Museum of Art, which acquired it in 1967.

References 

1892 paintings
Paintings in the collection of the Metropolitan Museum of Art
Paintings by Henri de Toulouse-Lautrec
Post-impressionist paintings
Works set in the Moulin Rouge
Paintings set in cabarets
Paintings of Montmartre